Greenways Countryside Project is an environmental project in the Ipswich area, Suffolk. It was founded in 1994 and by 2018 it was involved in the protection and management of around 100 square kilometres green spaces in and around Ipswich.

Foundation and early years
Greenways Countryside Project was founded in 1994 by Suffolk County Council, Ipswich Borough Council, Babergh District Council, and Suffolk Coastal District Council with funding from the Countryside Commission, which continued for six years. In its first ten years Greenways responsible for mobilising 7,181 volunteer days of work during this period.

Sites
Sites in which Greenways is involved include:
 Alderman Canal East and Alderman Canal West
 Bobbits Lane
 Millennium Wood
 Mill Stream Nature Reserve
 Sandlings

References

Ipswich
Environmental organisations based in the United Kingdom